Saigon Institute of Technology (Saigon Tech, Vietnamese: Trường Cao Đẳng Nghề Sài Gòn) is a university in Ho Chi Minh City, Vietnam specializing in information technology.

The technology university opened in 2001.

References

External links
 Saigon Institute of Information Technology (English)
 Saigon Institute of Technology (Vietnamese)
 Saigontech.net (Archive)

Universities in Ho Chi Minh City
Educational institutions established in 2001
2001 establishments in Vietnam